Tomislav Marijanović (born August 18, 1981) is a Croatian judoka.

He was placed 7th at the 2007 World Judo Championships in Brazil. He won 2010 IJF Grand Slam Rio. Marijanović has 12 gold medals from national senior championships (1998-2010, except 2004 when he finished 2nd). He trains in Croatian judo club "Student".

Achievements

References

External links
 
 

1981 births
Living people
Croatian male judoka
Sportspeople from Split, Croatia
Judoka at the 2012 Summer Olympics
Olympic judoka of Croatia
Mediterranean Games bronze medalists for Croatia
Competitors at the 2013 Mediterranean Games
Mediterranean Games medalists in judo
European Games competitors for Croatia
Judoka at the 2015 European Games
21st-century Croatian people
20th-century Croatian people